Xiangxicun station is a Metro station of Shenzhen Metro Line 9. It opened on 28 October 2016. This station is located under the intersection of Chunfeng Road and Dongmen South Road.

Station layout

Exits

References

External links
 Shenzhen Metro Xiangxicun Station (Chinese)
 Shenzhen Metro Xiangxicun Station (English)

Shenzhen Metro stations
Railway stations in Guangdong
Luohu District
Railway stations in China opened in 2016